Stonefield is a historic home located at Charlottesville, Virginia. It was built about 1860, as a simple, vernacular two-story, one-over-one-room frame house on a high brick basement.  A two-story Queen Anne style "facade", two rooms in width and one room deep, effectively masking the original rambling vernacular structure behind. It was added between 1880 and 1884. This section has a hipped roof with a large gable that overhangs a semi-octagonal bay-projection.

It was listed on the National Register of Historic Places in 1984.

References

Houses on the National Register of Historic Places in Virginia
Italianate architecture in Virginia
Queen Anne architecture in Virginia
Houses completed in 1860
Houses in Charlottesville, Virginia
National Register of Historic Places in Charlottesville, Virginia